Glenn Simmons is a Canadian singer, songwriter, multi-instrumentalist, record producer and actor. He is best known for being a founding member of The Wonderful Grand Band and The Fables.

Biography

Simmons’ career started in the early 1970s. He played in the local bands "Huski" with Brian Macleod, Chilliwack, and Headpins. In 1978, Simmons co-formed The Wonderful Grand Band (WGB). WGB was featured on local variety show "The Root Cellar", airing on CBC. The Wonderful Grand Band released their eponymous debut album in 1979. In 1980 WGB aired their own self-titled television show on CBC. They performed skits and played their own songs. The show ran for 3 years and aired more than 40 episodes. In 1981, WGB released their second album, "Living in a Fog". Several of the tracks from Living in a Fog were written by Simmons. WGB broke up in 1983. During the 1980s, Simmons toured and played locally with good friend Ron Hynes. In 1997 Simmons formed the Celtic Rock band "The Fables". The Fables released their award-winning debut album "Tear the House Down" in 1998. Simmons won the SOCAN Song of the Year award for the song "Tear the House Down". The Fables most popular song, "Heave Away" was released on this album. The Fables then released their second album, "A Time" in 2000, Their third, "Kings and Littles Ones" in 2007, and their fourth, "St. John's" in 2008. The Wonderful Grand Band reformed in 2009. In 2010 Simmons released his first solo album "Sweet Vanilla" and his first solo single, "Christmastime".
Simmons’ song “Heave Away” was covered with rewritten lyrics in the award-winning musical Come from Away.

Awards
1999 - Socan Song of the Year for Tear The House Down.
2000 - ECMA Entertainer of the Year with the Fables. 
2001-  ECMA Album of the Year for A Time.
2012 - Canadian Folk Award nomination for his work with The Navigators’ Soldiers and Sailors.
2015 - ECMA Musician's Achievement Award

Discography

The Wonderful Grand Band
The Wonderful Grand Band - 1979
Living in a Fog - 1981

The Fables
Tear the House Down - 1998
A Time - 2000
St. John's - 2002
Kings and Little Ones - 2007

Solo
Sweet Vanilla - 2010

Singles
Christmastime - 2010

References

External links
https://www.glennsimmonswebsite.com/about
http://www.thefables.com/about/
http://ecma.com/awards/archive/2000

Canadian rock musicians
Musicians from Newfoundland and Labrador
Living people
1954 births